The Monthly Weather Review is a peer-reviewed scientific journal published by the American Meteorological Society. It covers research related to analysis and prediction of observed and modeled circulations of the atmosphere, including technique development, data assimilation, model validation, and relevant case studies. This includes papers on numerical techniques and data assimilation techniques that apply to the atmosphere and/or ocean environment. The editor-in-chief is David M. Schultz (University of Manchester).

History 
The journal was established in July 1872 by the United States Army Signal Corps. It was issued by the Office of the Chief Signal Officer from 1872 until 1891. In 1891, the Signal Office's meteorological responsibilities were transferred to the Weather Bureau under the United States Department of Agriculture. The Weather Bureau published the journal until 1970 when the Bureau became part of the newly formed National Oceanic and Atmospheric Administration, which published it until the end of 1973. Since 1974, it has been published by the American Meteorological Society.

Abstracting and indexing 
The journal is abstracted and indexed in Current Contents/Physical, Chemical & Earth Sciences and the Science Citation Index. According to the Journal Citation Reports, the journal has a 2020 impact factor of 3.735.

References

External links 
 
 NOAA Central Library - Free access to articles prior to 1974

Meteorology journals
Monthly journals
English-language journals
Delayed open access journals
Publications established in 1872
1872 establishments in the United States
American Meteorological Society academic journals